Krivine is a surname. Notable people with the surname include:

Alain Krivine (1941-2022), French politician
Emmanuel Krivine (born 1947), French conductor
Jean-Louis Krivine (born 1939), French Mathematician, inventor of the Krivine machine

Alain, Emmanuel and Jean-Louis Krivine belongs to the same broad family, see Krivine family (fr)